Al Mushrif is a central neighborhood in the city of Abu Dhabi zone one, United Arab Emirates.

Al-Mushrif is located in an area between Sheikh Rashid Bin Saeed Street "Airport Road" and Arabian Gulf Street, which extends to Mussafah Bridge. It is the location of the Al Mushrif Palace and Umm Al Emarat Park, as well as Mushrif Mall. It also contains the Women's Handicrafts Centre, demonstrating practices such as saddu (carpet weaving) and talli (embroidering).

References

Neighborhoods of Abu Dhabi